

Review and events

Squad

Transfers

In

Out

Sources 

Mitra Kukar FC
Mitra Kukar F.C.